The 1998 Miller 200 was the seventh round of the 1998 CART FedEx Champ Car World Series season, held on May 31, 1998, on the Milwaukee Mile in West Allis, Wisconsin. The race was a fuel economy run where fuel conservation was a serious factor, and Jimmy Vasser dominated it and won by over seven seconds, the win being his second of the season.

Classification

Race

Caution flags

Lap Leaders

Point standings after race

References 

Miller 200
Milwaukee Indy 225
1998 in sports in Wisconsin